American actor Dustin Hoffman began his career by appearing in an episode of Naked City in 1961. His first theatrical performance was 1961's Shmem needs a shink as Ridzinski. Following several guest appearances on television, he starred in the 1966 play Eh?; his performance garnered him both a Theatre World Award and Drama Desk Award. Hoffman made his film debut in 1967 when he appeared in the comedy The Tiger Makes Out. In the same year, his breakthrough role as Benjamin "Ben" Braddock, the title character in Mike Nichols' comedy-drama The Graduate, led to Hoffman achieving star status and his first Academy Award nomination. He then acted in the play Jimmy Shine as the eponymous character and the comedy film Madigan's Millions (both 1968). In 1969, he starred alongside Jon Voight in the Academy Award for Best Picture winner Midnight Cowboy, for which Hoffman was nominated a second time for the Academy Award for Best Actor.

The 1970s saw Hoffman star in several critically acclaimed and commercially successful films, including the Western Little Big Man (1970), psychological thriller Straw Dogs (1971), prison film Papillon (1973) alongside Steve McQueen, Lenny (1974) about the controversial comedian Lenny Bruce, and the political thriller All the President's Men (1976) as journalist Carl Bernstein investigating the Watergate scandal alongside Bob Woodward (played by Robert Redford). After starring in the suspense-thriller Marathon Man (1976) and the crime drama Straight Time (1978), Hoffman starred in the 1979 drama Kramer vs. Kramer, which he won the Academy Award for Best Actor for the first time for his performance as Ted Kramer.

After a three-year acting hiatus, he starred in the comedy Tootsie in 1982 as a struggling actor who pretends to be a woman in order to get an acting role. He returned to stage acting with a 1984 performance as Willy Loman in Death of a Salesman – Hoffman reprised the role a year later in a television film. 1987 saw the release of originally ill-received comedy Ishtar, in which he starred with Warren Beatty; its critical support has since grown. He won his second Academy Award for Best Actor for his portrayal of the autistic savant Ray Babbitt in the 1988 film Rain Man, co-starring Tom Cruise.  In 1989, he was nominated for a Tony Award and a Drama Desk Award for playing Shylock in a stage performance of The Merchant of Venice. In the 1990s, he made appearances in such film as Warren Beatty's action comedy adaptation Dick Tracy (1990), Steven Spielberg's Hook (1991) as Captain Hook, guest starred in the 1991 "Lisa's Substitute" episode of The Simpsons, medical disaster Outbreak (1995), legal crime drama Sleepers (1996), thriller Mad City (1997), and the satirical black comedy Wag the Dog (1997) alongside Robert De Niro.

In the 2000s, he played theatrical producer Charles Frohman in Finding Neverland, co-starred in the comedy Meet the Fockers (both 2004) as Bernie Focker, the fantasy thriller Perfume: The Story of a Murderer (2006), and played the title character in the family comedy Mr. Magorium's Wonder Emporium (2007). Hoffman has acted in the Kung Fu Panda franchise since 2008 and reprised his role as Focker in Little Fockers (2010). He starred in the HBO drama series Luck, which was cancelled after one season due to animal safety concerns, and made his directorial debut in 2012 with Quartet.

Film

Television

Theatre

Music videos

See also 
 List of awards and nominations received by Dustin Hoffman

References 

Male actor filmographies
American filmographies